The Dash 7 Series is a line of diesel-electric freight locomotives built by GE Transportation Systems. It replaced the Universal Series in the mid-1970s, and was superseded by the Dash 8 Series in the mid-1980s.

Specifications 
All models of the Dash 7 Series are powered by a 12-cylinder or 16-cylinder, turbocharged, GE 7FDL 4-stroke diesel engine carried over from the Universal Series, and have speed-based adhesion control with a multi-channel LED annunciator panel.

Dash 7 Series traction motors are powered by direct current.

Construction history 
The Dash 7's predecessor, the Universal Series, had been introduced in the 1950s, and with its innovative body structure, it had initially been greeted favourably by the market.  However, GM-EMD had then developed the GP30 model to compete with it; GP30 production had commenced in 1961.  Over many years, the GP30's reliability had given it a sales advantage, and when EMD introduced its successor, the Dash 2, in 1972, the Universal Series became completely obsolete.  The Dash 7 Series was intended to redress the ensuing imbalance between the two competing manufacturers.

GE commenced production of the Dash 7 Series in 1976.  By the time Dash 7 production ceased in 1985, about 2,800 Dash 7 locomotives had been built - roughly the same number of units as the total production of the Universal Series.  By contrast, EMD built more than 8,000 Dash 2 locomotives.

Although the Dash 7 Series failed to surpass the Dash 2 in terms of market share, its 4-stroke engine returned better fuel consumption figures than the 2-stroke engine fitted to GM-EMD locomotives after the 1970s oil crisis.  The Dash 7 Series was therefore positively received.

Nomenclature 
The naming of the Dash 7 Series, and that of its various models, is based upon wheel arrangement and power output.  So, for example, "B30-7" designates a B-B configured  Dash 7 Series locomotive.

Four axle models

Common features 
Specifications common to all Dash 7 Series four axle models are as follows:

 AAR wheel arrangement: B-B 
 Prime mover: GE 12-cylinder V-type 7FDL12 or 16-cylinder V-type 7FDL16 four stroke diesel engine

B23-7 

This model was manufactured between 1977 and 1984 and was fitted with a 12-cylinder 7FDL12 engine.

It replaced GE's U23B, and competed with the very successful EMD GP38-2.

A total of 537 B23-7s were built for 9 U.S. customers and 2 Mexican customers.

Southern Railway's 54 units had Southern's "standard" high-short-hoods.
 
These engines are frequently rebuilt as a Control Car Remote Control Locomotive (CCRCL), due to their low value on the used locomotive market.

 Power output:

BQ23-7 

The BQ23-7 model was a variant of the B23-7 built between 1978 and 1979.

It was mechanically identical to the B23-7.

The 'Q' in the model designation stood for "crew Quarters", and referred to the model's enlarged operating cab for accommodating the train crew.

Only ten were built, all for the Seaboard Coast Line railroad.  They were nicknamed "Busses" by the operating crews and "Aegis Cruisers" by some railfans, due to their boxy shape.

 Power output:

B30-7 

The B30-7 was of similar length to the B23-7, but was equipped with a more powerful 16-cylinder 7FDL16 engine.  It replaced the U30B model.

Between December 1977 and May 1982, a total of 279 units of the B30-7 model were produced.

These production numbers include the three different B30-7A variants described below.

All of the B30-7s were built for U.S. customers.

 Power output:

B30-7A 

This model was a variant of the B30-7 fitted with a 12-cylinder 7FDL12 engine generating the same power output as the B30-7.

Three different versions of the B30-7A variant were produced.
 
B30-7As were built only for the Missouri Pacific Railroad and are externally identical to the 16 cylinder B30-7.

Cabless B30-7As were built only for the Burlington Northern Railroad.
 
B30-7A1s were built only for the Southern Railway.

 Power output:

B36-7 

The B36-7 model was manufactured between 1980 and 1985, and was fitted with a 16-cylinder 7FDL16 engine.

The model was designed as a successor to the U36B.

A total of 222 B36-7's were built for North American railroads, and a further eight units were delivered to a Columbian coal mining operation.

The largest customer for the model was Seaboard System, which became part of CSX Transportation in 1986.

Seaboard System took delivery of 120 B36-7s; the model's second biggest customer, Conrail, acquired 60 units.

 Power output:

Six axle models

Common features 
Specifications common to all Dash 7 Series six axle models are as follows:

 AAR wheel arrangement: C-C 
 Prime mover: GE 12-cylinder V-type 7FDL12 or 16-cylinder V-type 7FDL16 four stroke diesel engine

C30-7 

The C30-7 model was manufactured between 1976 and 1986 and was fitted with a 16-cylinder 7FDL engine.

It replaced the U30C model.

A total of 1,137 C30-7s were built, all of them for North American railroads.

These production numbers include the 50 C30-7A variants described below.

Approximately half of the C30-7s have since been exported to Brazil after being sold by their original owners.

 Power output:

C30-7A 

This model was a variant of the C30-7 fitted with a 12-cylinder 7FDL12 engine generating the same power output as the B30-7.

The smaller engine used less fuel than the 16-cylinder version.
 
A total of 50 C30-7As were built in mid-1984, and delivered to Conrail.

They are externally similar to the C30-7, except that they have six tall hood doors per side (in place of eight) and moved front grilles on long hood, also only 4 steps.

In 2003, nineteen C30-7As were rebuilt and exported to Estonia as C30-7Ais.  

 Power output:

C36-7 

The C36-7 model was manufactured between 1978 and 1989, and was fitted with a 16-cylinder 7FDL16 engine.

Most were made in the United States, but GE do Brasil built 15 C36-7s for Ferrocarriles Nacionales de México.

A total of 599 units of the model were built; 422 of them were exported to the People's Republic of China, which designated it ND5.

The largest North American customer for the C36-7 was Missouri Pacific Railroad, which took delivery of 60 units.

In 1982, Missouri Pacific merged with Union Pacific; in 2003, all but two of the MP/UP C36-7s were exported to Estonia.

 Power output:

See also

List of GE locomotives

References

Notes

Bibliography

External links 
 GE Transportation Systems. Earlier Locomotive Models – includes the Dash 7 Series
 NorthEast Rails: GE Dash 7 23-30 Diesel Railroad Locomotives; GE Dash 7 33-36 Diesel Railroad Locomotives

Dash 7 Series
B-B locomotives
C-C locomotives
Diesel-electric locomotives of the United States
Railway locomotives introduced in 1976
Diesel-electric locomotives of Brazil